Julien Lehouck (14 August 1896 – 25 February 1944) was a Belgian sprinter. He competed in the men's 100 metres at the 1920 Summer Olympics. He was part of the Belgian Resistance and was executed in Fort Breendonk during World War II.

References

External links
 

1896 births
1944 deaths
Athletes (track and field) at the 1920 Summer Olympics
Belgian male sprinters
Belgian male long jumpers
Olympic athletes of Belgium
Sportspeople from West Flanders
Belgian resistance members
People who died in Breendonk prison camp
Resistance members killed by Nazi Germany
Resistance members who died in Nazi concentration camps
Belgian people executed in Nazi concentration camps